Red Hat Network (abbreviated to RHN) is a family of systems-management services operated by Red Hat. RHN makes updates, patches, and bug fixes of packages included within Red Hat Linux and Red Hat Enterprise Linux available to subscribers. Other available features include the deployment of custom content to, and the provisioning, configuration, reporting, monitoring of client systems.

Users of these operating systems can then invoke the up2date or yum program to download and install updates from RHN. The updates portion of RHN is akin to other types of automatic system maintenance tools such as Microsoft Update for Microsoft Windows operating systems. The system requires a subscription to allow access to updates. 

On June 18, 2008 Red Hat CEO Jim Whitehurst announced plans for the RHN Satellite software to be open-sourced following the Fedora/RHEL model.
Subsequently, project Spacewalk was launched.

Architecture 
In the basic subscription model the information about a managed host is stored on Red Hat's servers, and updates get downloaded directly from those servers as well. For an organization that manages multiple machines this is inefficient bandwidth-wise. Red Hat offers a proxy server (Red Hat Network Proxy) that once installed at a site allows machines to securely download updates locally. Advanced lifecycle management; provisioning features, like bare metal PXE boot provisioning; and monitoring features (e.g. centralized CPU and disk usage) cannot be done over the Internet to the hosted RHN servers. These features require a RHN Satellite Server running locally.  the RHN Proxy Server costs $2,500 annually, and the RHN Satellite Server costs $13,500 annually, which includes the license for the embedded Oracle Database.

History

References

External links

Red Hat Network (login to the hosted RHN application)
RHN Satellite
Project Spacewalk

Network